Umbagog Lake State Park is a  park in Errol, New Hampshire, on the southern shore of Umbagog Lake along Route 26. It is adjacent to the Umbagog National Wildlife Refuge.

Activities in the state park include swimming, camping, canoeing, fishing, hiking, wildlife watching, and picnicking. There is a public campground and a public boat launch ramp which may be accessed from New Hampshire Route 26. There are 33 wilderness campsites, accessible only by boat, which are located around the lake. The park includes a visitor center and a marina with canoe, kayak, and rowboat rentals, and a beach area. It is the only state park east of Michigan that is classified as Bortle 1 for night skies, which means that it is a state park that has pristine astronomical viewing.

The park is 1 of 10 New Hampshire state parks that are in the path of totality for the 2024 solar eclipse, with 1 minute and 33 seconds of totality.

References

External links
Umbagog Lake State Park New Hampshire Department of Natural and Cultural Resources

State parks of New Hampshire
Parks in Coös County, New Hampshire
Errol, New Hampshire
Protected areas established in 1998
1998 establishments in New Hampshire